Kani Rash (also Romanized as Kānī Rash) is a village in Kani Bazar Rural District, Khalifan District, Mahabad County, West Azerbaijan Province, Iran. At the 2006 census, its population was 355, in 54 families.

References 

Populated places in Mahabad County